The 2023 Tour de France will be the 110th edition of the Tour de France. It will start in Bilbao, Spain on 1 July and end at with the final stage at Champs-Élysées, Paris on 23 July.

Classification standings

Stage 12 
13 July 2023 – Roanne to Belleville-en-Beaujolais,

Stage 13 
14 July 2023 – Châtillon-sur-Chalaronne to Grand Colombier,

Stage 14 
15 July 2023 – Annemasse to Portes du Soleil,

Stage 15 
16 July 2023 – Portes du Soleil to Saint-Gervais Mont Blanc,

Rest day 2 
17 July 2023 – Saint-Gervais Mont Blanc

Stage 16 
18 July 2023 – Passy to Combloux,

Stage 17 
19 July 2023 – Saint-Gervais Mont Blanc to Courchevel,

Stage 18 
20 July 2023 – Moûtiers to Bourg-en-Bresse,

Stage 19 
21 July 2023 – Moirans-en-Montagne to Poligny,

Stage 20 
22 July 2023 – Belfort to Le Markstein Fellering,

Stage 21 
23 July 2023 – Saint-Quentin-en-Yvelines to Paris (Champs-Élysées),

Notes

References 

2023 Tour de France
Tour de France stages